The Oregon Health Authority (OHA) is a government agency in the U.S. state of Oregon. It was established by the passage of Oregon House Bill 2009 by the 75th Oregon Legislative Assembly, and split off from Oregon Department of Human Services, OHA oversees most of Oregon's health-related programs including behavioral health (addictions and mental health), public health, Oregon State Hospital for individuals requiring secure residential psychiatric care, and the state's Medicaid program called the Oregon Health Plan. Its policy work is overseen by the nine member Oregon Health Policy Board.

The interim Health Authority director is James Schroeder. Its first director was Bruce Goldberg, M.D., former director of the Oregon Department of Human Services.

The mission of the Oregon Health Authority is helping people and communities achieve optimum physical, mental and social well-being through partnerships, prevention and access to quality, affordable health care.

OHA is responsible for the state's Medicaid program, which is operated under a Medicaid Demonstration waiver from the U.S. Centers for Medicare and Medicaid Services (CMS), known as an 1115 Waiver. The demonstration includes coordinated care organizations (a form of accountable care organization or ACO) as the Medicaid delivery system; flexibility in use of federal funds by the CCOs; and a federal investment of approximately $1.9 billion over five years, tied to an agreement by the state to reduce the trend in per-capita medical spending by two percentage points by the end of the waiver's second year.

Divisions
OHA consists of these Divisions
 External Relations Division
 Fiscal and Operations Division
 Health Policy and Analytics Division
 Health Systems Division
 Office of Equity and Inclusion
 Oregon State Hospital
 Public Health Division

References

External links
 
 Oregon Public Health Division
 Oregon Health Policy Board

Health Authority
2009 establishments in Oregon
Medical and health organizations based in Oregon
Government agencies established in 2009
State departments of health of the United States